The Blériot XXI was an early French aircraft built by Blériot Aéronautique.

Design
The aircraft was a shoulder-wing monoplane powered by a 52 kW (70 hp) Gnome Gamma 7-cylinder rotary engine driving a two-bladed propeller. The pilot and passenger were seated in side-by-side configuration: the control column was centrally mounted and there were two sets of rudder pedals, so that it could be flown from either seat. The shallow section rectangular fuselage tapered to a horizontal knife-edge at the tail, with the elongated triangular horizontal stabiliser mounted in the middle, its covering blending into that of the upper and lower fuselage surface. A semi-elliptical elevator was mounted on the trailing edge, and a triangular balanced rudder was mounted above the rear fuselage. Lateral control was effected by wing-warping, the wires leading to a single inverted V-strut cabane above the fuselage and a similar V strut beneath. Petrol was stored in three tanks: a pair of gravity tanks were located under the top decking in front of the cockpit, pressure-fed from a larger tank under the seats.

The undercarriage was a variant of the well-proved pattern used on the Blériot XI, with the wheels mounted on a trailing arm free to slide up and down and sprung  by bungee cords.  Unlike that of the Blériot XI, the main vertical members terminated in a crossbar below the fuselage rather than one attached to the upper longerons, and it was also braced by a pair of diagonal struts either side, the front pair leading to the front of the upper longerons and forming the front of the raked engine cowling. The tailskid was made of two U-shaped pieces of rattan cane.

A Type XXI was one of the two Blériot designs entered for the 1912 British Military Aeroplane Competition.

Specifications

References

1900s French experimental aircraft
21
Single-engined tractor aircraft
Shoulder-wing aircraft
Aircraft first flown in 1911